Babiće is a village located in the municipality of Zubin Potok, in Kosovo. According to 2009 estimates for the 2011 Kosovan census, it has 4 inhabitants, of whom the majority are Serbs.

Notes

References

Villages in Zubin Potok